Joseph Kelway (also Kellaway, Kellway; c. 1702–1782) was an English organist and harpsichord player, among the most highly regarded in his day.

Life
Kelway was probably born in Chichester. He was the younger brother of the organist Thomas Kelway; he studied with him and with Francesco Geminiani.

In 1734 he succeeded Obadiah Shuttleworth as organist of St Michael, Cornhill in London; in 1736 he resigned this post to succeed John Weldon as organist of St Martin-in-the-Fields, London. Charles Burney wrote that Handel was among the musicians who visited St Martin's to hear him play. Kelway became in 1739 a founding governor of the Royal Society of Musicians.

His pupils included Charles Wesley and Mrs Mary Delaney, and he was appointed harpsichord master to Queen Charlotte, wife of George III, at the time of her arrival in England in 1761. Richard, 7th Viscount FitzWilliam was a patron.

Burney wrote that Kelway, as a harpsichordist, was "head of the Scarlatti sect". His only notable publication was Six Sonatas for Harpsichord (1764), influenced by Scarlatti. Towards the end of his life, his music went out of fashion: a new style was introduced by Johann Christian Bach, and the pianoforte became fashionable.

References

External links
 
 

1702 births
1782 deaths
People from Chichester
English classical organists
British male organists
18th-century keyboardists
Members of the Royal Society of Musicians
Male classical organists